Danuvius may refer to:

 Danube – river in Europe; Danuvius in Latin
 Danuvius (deity) – ancient Roman river god 
 Danuvius guggenmosi – extinct great ape